Ö1 Inforadio was an Austrian online information radio station broadcast by ORF.

It broadcast news and information, culture and politics 24 hours a day. Unlike the main Ö1 station, it only comprised spoken word and did not broadcast music.
The station was only receivable via an internet stream. Ö1 Inforadio did not broadcast advertisements.

See also
Ö1
ORF the Austrian publicly funded radio broadcaster

Defunct radio stations in Austria
ORF (broadcaster)
Radio stations disestablished in 2011